Christopher "Christy" Forde (21 December 1903 – 20 November 1959) was an Irish hurler who played as a goalkeeper for the Dublin and Tipperary senior teams.

Forde made his first appearance for the Dublin team during the 1933 championship and was a regular member of the starting fifteen until his retirement after the 1940 championship. During that time he won one All-Ireland medal, two Leinster medals and one National Hurling League medal.

At club level Forde began his career with Lorrha–Dorrha before later playing club hurling in Dublin.

References

1903 births
1959 deaths
Lorrha-Dorrha hurlers
Tipperary inter-county hurlers
Dublin inter-county hurlers
Hurling goalkeepers
All-Ireland Senior Hurling Championship winners